Onești is a village in Strășeni District, Moldova.

References

Villages of Strășeni District